After the Reign is a Blackfoot album released on May 24, 1994, through Wildcat Records. Guitarist Zakk Wylde makes a guest appearance on the title track playing the second solo in the lead break section.

Track listing
All songs by Rickey Medlocke and Benny Rappa except where noted:
"Sittin' On Top of the World" – 4:40 (Lonnie Chatmon, Walter Vinson)
"Nobody Rides For Free" – 3:58 (Medlocke, Mark Woerpel)
"Tupelo Honey" – 4:31 (Van Morrison)
"Rainbow" – 4:28
"It's All Over Now" – 4:29
"The Road's My Middle Name" – 4:06 (Bonnie Raitt)
"Hang Time" – 4:24
"Tonight" – 3:40
"After The Reign" – 5:19 (Medlocke, Rappa, Woerpel)
"Bandelaro" – 3:34

Personnel
 Rickey Medlocke – vocals, guitar
 Benny Rappa – drums, percussion
 Mark Woerpel – guitar, synthesizer
 Tim Stunson – bass guitar

References

1994 albums
Blackfoot (band) albums